The World Open Pairs Championship is a contract bridge competition initiated in 1962 and held as part of the World Bridge Series Championships every four years. Open to all pairs without any quota restrictions on nationality, the championship is widely regarded as the most prestigious pairs competition in contract bridge. In its present form, the competition lasts eight days.

Results

World meets commonly run for 15 days on a schedule whose details vary.

In 2006 the Open Pairs played Saturday to Saturday, the 8th to 15th days of the meet, with five qualifying, five semifinal, and five final sessions. At the start of qualifying, 32 teams remained in the knockout stage of the marquee teams competition for the Rosenblum Cup. During qualifying sessions for the pairs, the Rosenblum teams were reduced from 32 to 8. There were some provisions for late entry to the pairs by players knocked out of the teams at a late stage. There were 392 pairs in the qualifier, 193 in the semifinal, and 72 in the final.

United States pairs have won four of 14 tournaments through 2014, Brazil two, Poland two, and six other nations one each. (The tournament is "open" in several respects including the registered nationalities of partners but no transnational pair has won any of the 42 medals.) Marcelo Branco of Brazil is the only two-time champion.

See also
World Mixed Pairs Championship
World Women Pairs Championship

Notes

References

External links
 World Open Pairs Championships 1962–present (table) at the World Bridge Federation.

Open Pairs